Tollie Records was a record label formed in February 1964, as a subsidiary label of Vee-Jay Records. It closed in May 1965.

The label distributed two of the Beatles' singles in the United States before Capitol Records eventually took over. The first single was "Twist and Shout" b/w "There's a Place" (Tollie 9001), which was released in February 1964, amid the flurry of Beatlemania that was sweeping the United States at that time. This single version of their recording reached the number 2 position on Billboard's Top 40 Hit Singles chart, with its B-side "There's a Place" reaching number 74, while the other top five spots were also Beatles records: "Can't Buy Me Love", Capitol, No. 1; "She Loves You", Swan, No. 3; "I Want to Hold Your Hand", Capitol, No. 4; "Please Please Me", Vee-Jay, No. 5.

The second single released by Tollie was "Love Me Do" b/w "P.S. I Love You" (Tollie 9008), in April 1964. It went all the way to number 1 in Billboard, while its B-side "PS I Love You" reached number 10. Although the label released a total of 48 singles before it ceased operation in 1965, the Beatles records were its only million-sellers. The label's second release was the Dowlands' cover of the Beatles "All My Loving" b/w "Hey Sally" (Tollie 9002). The Dowlands had a UK number 24 hit with the track, which was produced by Joe Meek. Their recording is an almost exact copy of George Martin's Beatles production.

Previous releases of some early Beatles songs on the Vee-Jay label in the summer of 1963 failed to chart in America. "From Me to You" reached no higher than No. 47 on one American Northwest Chart (KISN Radio in Portland, Oregon), in late August 1963.

See also 
 List of record labels

References

External links

http://www.beatlesagain.com/barchive/b4capitl.html
http://www.friktech.com/btls/bc1.htm
http://www.friktech.com/btls/bc2.htm

American record labels
Pop record labels
Record labels established in 1964
Record labels disestablished in 1965